Sinhaeundae station is a railway station of the Donghae Line in Jwa-dong, Haeundae-gu, Busan, the Republic of Korea. The new station is situated in the Haeundae New Town (Jwa-dong) district, about 20 to 25 minutes by bus from the Haeundae Station of Busan Metro and actually nearer to the Jangsan Station also on Line 2. The Haeundae KORAIL station was relocated to its new location on December 2, 2013. As of December 18, 2017, the name "Sinhaeundae Station" is used in signage, tickets and train announcements.

Former Haeundae station 

The former station placed at 621, Haeun-daero, Haeundae-gu, Busan, Republic of Korea. This area will change to a park for Haeundae people.

Station layout

References

Haeundae District
Korail stations
Railway stations in Busan
Railway stations opened in 1934
1934 establishments in Korea